The men's 4 × 400 metres relay competition of the athletics events at the 2011 Pan American Games took place on the 27 and 28 October at the Telmex Athletics Stadium.  The defending Pan American Games champion were Andrae Williams, Avard Moncur, Michael Matheau and Chris Brown of Bahamas.

Records
Prior to this competition, the existing world and Pan American Games records were as follows:

Qualification
Each National Olympic Committee (NOC) was able to enter one team.

Schedule

Results
All times shown are in seconds.

Semifinals
The semifinals were held on October 27. Qualification: First 3 teams of each heat (Q) plus the next 2 fastest (q) qualified for the final.

Final
Held on October 28.

References

Athletics at the 2011 Pan American Games
2011